Chimané (Tsimané) is a South American language isolate. Some dialects are known as Mosetén (Mosetén of Santa Ana, Mosetén of Covendo). Chimane is a language of the western Bolivian lowlands spoken by the Tsimane peoples along the Beni River and the region around San Borja in the Department of Beni (Bolivia). Sakel (2004) classifies them as two languages for a number of reasons, yet some of the variants of the language are mutually intelligible and they reportedly have no trouble communicating (Ethnologue 16)  and were evidently a single language separated recently through cultural contact (Campbell 2000).

Status 
The dialects of Tsimané are in different sociolinguistic situations. Covendo Mosetén has around 600 speakers, while Santa Ana Mosetén only has around 150-200 speakers. Both of these dialects are fading quickly, and almost all speakers of these dialects are bilingual in Spanish. Only older speakers maintain use of the language without Spanish influence. Tsimané proper, on the other hand, has at least 4,000 speakers, and the number of speakers is growing. In addition, the majority of speakers of Tsimané proper are monolingual. The Mosetén were in contact with missions for almost 200 years, while the Tsimané have remained isolated for much longer, thus leading the Tsimané to preserve their customs and traditions, including language, much more than the Mosetén.

Dialects
Dialects listed by Mason (1950):

Moseten
Amo
Aparono
Cunana
Chumpa
Magdaleno
Punnucana
Rache
Muchanes
Tucupi
Chimane
Chimaniza
Chumano
Nawazi-Monlji

Classification
Mosetenan has no obvious relatives among the languages of South America. There is some lexicon shared with Puquina and the Uru–Chipaya languages, but these appear to be borrowings. Morris Swadesh suggested a Moseten–Chon relationship, which Suárez provided evidence for in the 1970s, and with which Kaufman (1990) is sympathetic.

Language contact
Jolkesky (2016) notes that there are lexical similarities with the Uru-Chipaya, Yurakare, and Pano language families due to contact.

Writing system 
Chimane has been written since 1980 in a Spanish-based alphabet devised by Wayne Gill. It uses the additional letters ṕ, ć, q́u, tś, ćh, mʼ, nʼ, ä. It is widely used in publications and is taught in Chimane schools.

In 1996, Colette Grinevald created an alphabet for Moseten and Chimane which used only those letters found on a Spanish keyboard. It included the multigraphs ph khdh ch chh tsh dh, and was adopted by the Moseten.

Bolivian Law 3603 of 2007 Jan 17 recognizes the rights of the Chimane and Moseten to their language in all aspects of life in Bolivia, including education, and Chimane translation of policy which concerns them, and that written Chimane must use the unique Chimane(-Moseten) alphabet. However, it does not clarify which alphabet this is.

Phonology 
Tsimané has 5 vowels:

Tsimané has 24 consonants:

Vocabulary
Loukotka (1968) lists the following basic vocabulary items for Mosetene and Chimane.

{| class="wikitable sortable"
! gloss !! Mosetene !! Chimane
|-
! one
| irit || íris
|-
! two
| pára || pöre
|-
! three
| chibin || chiːbi
|-
! tooth
| moñín || múdyin
|-
! tongue
| nem || ném
|-
! hand
| uñ || ín
|-
! woman
| pen || pén
|-
! water
| oxñi || oñé
|-
! fire
| tsi || tsí
|-
! moon
| ivua || ihúa
|-
! maize
| tára || tãra
|-
! jaguar
| itsiki || ítsikí
|-
! house
| aka || aká
|}

References 
Notes

Sources
 
 Sakel, Jeanette (2009). Mosetén y Chimane (Tsimane'). In: Mily Crevels and Pieter Muysken (eds.) Lenguas de Bolivia, vol. I, 333–375. La Paz: Plural editores.

External links 
 ELAR archive of Chimane Documentation Project
 Mosetén (Intercontinental Dictionary Series)

Language isolates of South America
Languages of Bolivia
Mamoré–Guaporé linguistic area